Our Lady of Perpetual Help School in Vancouver, British Columbia, is a Catholic elementary school. The school opened in 1927, run by the Sisters of Charity of Halifax.

The school, along with the O.L.P.H. parish, is located on West 10th Avenue, between Camosun and Crown Streets. There are two classes in each grade, with the exception of preschool, with three classes.

2005 school fire

On March 5, 2005, at about 4:00 am local time, a 3-alarm fire began in the 5B classroom, destroying the oldest section of the school in fire and water damage.  Vancouver College took in the whole school community until the beginning of May 2005, where the burned sections were closed off, and portables were set up in place of the damaged classrooms.

Finally, the school was entirely repaired before the end of the 2005–06 school year, and the portables were removed.

External links
 Our Lady of Perpetual Help Catholic School

Elementary schools in Vancouver